The Missing Piece is the ninth album by British progressive rock band Gentle Giant which was released in 1977. After the Interview tour this return to the studio marked a change of direction for the band with the first side of the album exploring different musical directions than the band was previously known for, including pop music and punk rock, while the second side was more in the vein of their signature progressive rock style.  This was the last Gentle Giant album to chart in the United States.

Track listing
All lead vocals by Derek Shulman, except "As Old as You're Young", sung by Kerry Minnear and Shulman.

Personnel
Gentle Giant
 Gary Green – electric guitar, acoustic guitars (track 7)
 Kerry Minnear – Hammond organ (tracks 1, 2, 5-9), electric piano (tracks 1, 2, 5, 7), piano (tracks 4-6, 8), synthesizer (tracks 1, 4, 7), Minimoog (tracks 3, 6, 8), Clavinet (track 6), percussion (track 8), vocals (track 6)
 Derek Shulman – lead vocals on all tracks
 Ray Shulman – bass, 12-string guitars (track 7), percussion (track 8)
 John Weathers – drums (track 1-6, 8, 9), tambourine (tracks 1, 5, 6, 8, 9), cymbal crash (track 7), percussion (track 8), rhythm machine (track 8)

There are no official instrument credits listed on the album.

Charts

Release history
 1977, UK, Chrysalis Records CHR-1152, release date August 26, 1977, LP
 1977, UK, Chrysalis Records CHR-1152, release date ? ? 1977, Cassette
 1977, US, Capitol Records ST-11696, release date September 12, 1977, LP
 1977, US, Capitol Records ST-11696, release date ? ? 1977, Cassette
 1977, Brazil, Chrysalis Records 6307 604, release date ? ? 1977, LP
 1981?, US, Capitol Records SN-16046, release date ? ? ?, LP (re-release)
 ?, US, Capitol Records 18742, release date ? ? ?, CD
 1994, UK, Terrapin Trucking TRUCKCD006, release date 15 July 1994, CD (re-master)
 1996, US, One Way CD 18469, release date 16 March 1996, CD
 1999, UK, Beat Goes On BGOCD435, release date 16 April 1999, CD (2× CD with Giant for a Day!)
 2005, UK, DRT Entertainment/Pinnacle RTE356, release date 5 September 2005, CD (35th anniversary enhanced re-master)

References

1977 albums
Gentle Giant albums
Chrysalis Records albums
Capitol Records albums